Liesing is the 23rd district of Vienna. It is on the southwest edge of Vienna, Austria.

It was formed after Austria's Anschluss with Germany, when Vienna expanded from 21 districts to 26. Fifteen Lower Austrian districts, especially the old legal jurisdiction of Liesing, were incorporated into the 25th district.

After the allied occupation of Vienna, this law was not recognized and Liesing became a part of Lower Austria in the Soviet occupation zone. In 1946, a law intended to alter the districts of Vienna was vetoed by the occupation authorities. In 1954 the objection was withdrawn. Liesing was one of only two districts that remained in Vienna in the new organization. The areas Breitenfurt bei Wien, Laab im Walde, Purkersdorf, Perchtoldsdorf, Vösendorf, and Kaltenleutgeben returned to Lower Austria.

Since 1954, the 23rd district has been composed of the following former districts: Atzgersdorf, Erlaa, Inzersdorf, Kalksburg, Liesing, Mauer, Rodaun, and Siebenhirten.

Geography

Liesing lies in the southwest of Vienna and borders Lower Austria along with the districts Favoriten, Meidling, und Hietzing. The district lies along both sides of the Liesing brook and extends from the Vienna Woods into the Vienna Basin. With 7.7% of the total area, Liesing is the fifth largest district of Vienna and a third is natural areas. Areas in the district were threatened by flooding for a long time.

Geology
Liesing contains three geological regions including parts of the Vienna Woods and the Vienna Basin. The steep slopes and bare rocks of the Northern Chalk Alps (Kalksteinwienerwald) are found in the southwest of the district and stretch north as far as the Dorother Wald and, in the east, reach as far as Antonshöhe hill. The chalk zone in Liesing is divided into two sections. The Anhöhe of the Leopoldsdorfer Wald consists of Hauptdolomit, a type of rock formation that stretches in the direction of Kalksburg as far as the Himmelwiese. North of the dolomite zone, there is a wide band of Kieselkalk chalk. In the chalk region can be found the Antonshöhe, where radiolarit for flint cutting edges was mined in the Late Stone Age. North of the Kaltenleutgebner Straße along the edge of the valley can be found quarries delivering chalk, mergel, sandstone etc. for the building industry. To the north, are the soft hills of the Flyschzone (Sandstone Vienna Woods). During the formation of the alps, several layers of stone, sandstone, mergel and chalkmergel were deformed. The Laab und Kahlenberg "Decke" are relics of a sea that stretched from the edge of the alps to the Carpathian mountains during the Cretaceous Period and early Tertiary Period. At the final stage of the formation of the alps during the Miocene, the sea floor sank, leading to the formation of the Vienna Basin. Today this area lies mainly east of the edge of the woods. Gravel, sand and sandstone dominate this park of the district. In Atzgersdorf, the "Atzgersdorfer Kalkstein" was quarried for centuries, out of which Sarmatium was produced. In the Liesing area, deposits of tegel were formed during the Miocene and Pliocene.

Mountains and rivers
North of the Reichen Liesing, the Wilder Berg and the Antonshöhe are the highest points. To the east, the hills get progressively lower. To the north, Liesing borders on the Rosenhügel (in Hietzing) and the Wienerberg hill (in Favoriten).

The most important water course in Liesing has always been the Liesingbach. The "Reiche Liesing" flows from the west through Kalksburg, where it is joined by Gütenbach, which drains part of the Lainzer Tiergarten. Below Kalksburg, the Kalksburger Graben joins the Reiche Liesing underground, before it joins the "Dürre Liesing" to form the "Liesing". The canalization of the Liesing has been recently partially restored to a natural form. In the northern part of the district, the ponds, alte Ziegelteiche, Figurenteich and Steinsee (the latter not accessible to the public) can all be found along the Liesing. South of Siebenhirten, is the Schellensee lake which is also closed to the public.

District sections (Bezirksteile)

Liesing was formed from eight previously independent communities. In the east is Inzersdorf, where the large industrially and commercially used areas as well as the fruit and vegetable market are found. This was also previously the location of the Inzersdorfer company named after the district. To the west of Inzersdorf is Erlaa, which today is best known for the large residential apartment complex (Wohnpark Alt-Erlaa) located north of the old centre of the village. The adjacent Siebenhirten, to the south, is also mainly residential and is connected to the U-Bahn on the U6 line by the terminal station of the same name. The Liesing industrial park is also part of Siebenhirten. West of Siebenhirten is the area of Liesing which lends its name to the whole district. In addition to the old centre with its town hall (Bezirksamt) and bus & rail connecting point, the eastern part of Liesing is also used for commercial purposes. North of Liesing is Atzgersdorf, with a mixture of low-density housing and commercial areas along the railway line, with little access to green areas. In the northwest of the district, is the village of Mauer, with low-density housing, vineyards, and the largest share of the Vienna Woods. South of Mauer are Rodaun and Kalksburg, both of which are extensively green and retain largely intact village structures.

History
In 1954, Liesing was incorporated as the 23rd District, combining 8 former district municipalities:
Atzgersdorf, Erlaa,
Inzersdorf, Kalksburg,
Liesing,
Mauer,
Rodaun and Siebenhirten.

Even before the creation of the district, municipality existed between the old towns of the territory, with various political groupings in the administration. Since the Middle Ages, connections had been noted. Kadolt the Elder from around Eckartsau, in the 14th century, had formed a certain political unity with the places Erlaa, Kalksburg, Mauer and Rodaun.
Also the parish Atzgersdorf played a role, up to the Josephine reforms, as a regional religious centre of power for surrounding villages. From there, the Catholic residents of Altmannsdorf, Erlaa, Hetzendorf, Liesing, Mauer, Siebenhirten and partly Kalksburg, while having their own church buildings, did not have their own parishes.

Politics

The SPÖ has always been the strongest party in Liesing.
At the first free votes after World War II the SPÖ reached 55.3%
and the absolute majority the ÖVP 31.7% and the KPÖ remarkable 13%.
In 1946 Hans Radfux from the Socialdemocrats followed the former Sowjetunion appointed District Director.
Following this the SPÖ dominated the district and always appointed the District Director.
At the last district election in 2010 the SPÖ reached 43.7% (minus 7.4%),
the ÖVP 15.8% (minus 3.6%), the FPÖ 25.2% (plus 11.8%) the Greens 11.9% (minus 0.9%)
The BZÖ reached 1.3% (plus 0.2%).

Population

Population development
The present district area of Liesing as before World War I had persistent growth figures, but it lacked comparable, little urbanized areas, such as in Donaustadt or Floridsdorf. Nevertheless, the still independent communities could triple their population of 13,945 (1869) to 38,047 (1910). Then, the population stagnated after the end of the second world war. After the communities, in 1954, were finally joined, as the District of Liesing, to Vienna, the population began to rise again continuously. The strongest growth spurt was in the 1960s. Through the rebuilding of the areas between the old village cores, with modern residential properties, the population rose to 2006 with 89,986 people. Nevertheless, Liesing is still the most under-populated district of Vienna. In 2005, only three districts were as thinly populated as Liesing, with 2741 inhabitants/km2.

Population structure
The population structure of Liesing, in 2005, mainly lay in the average for Vienna, although the age group between 55 and 74 was significantly over-represented. The number of children under 15 years of age was 14.8 percent of the district population, while the average of Vienna was 14.6%. The proportion of the population between 15 and 59 years was 60.7% (Vienna: 63.4%), below the average, while people aged 60 or more years were 24.6% (Vienna: 22.0%) of the district population.

The gender distribution of the District, in 2001, was 46.6% men and 53.4% women. The number of the married population was, with a share of 44.7% compared with 41.2%, above the average for Vienna.

Origin and language
The proportion of foreign population, in 2005, amounted to 8.9 percent (versus Vienna citywide: 18.7%). This was the lowest value of a Vienna district. As in the entire state, the proportion of foreigners has grown, as in 2001, the proportion was at 6.7 percent. The highest proportion of foreigners, in 2005, were, with 1.7% share of the district population, citizens from Serbia and Montenegro. Another 1.1% were German, 0.8% Turkish, 0.7% Polish and Croatian 0.6% respectively Bosnian citizens.

As a whole, in 2001, 14.2% of the district population were not born in Austria. Nearly 2.4% reported their common language as Serbian, 1.6% as Turkish, and 1.4 as Croatian.

Religious preferences

Liesing has one of the highest population shares of people with Roman Catholic faith, 55.2%, compared with Vienna overall at 49.2%,
due to a very low foreign share. Eleven Catholic Parishes form the town Deconate 23 in the municipality.
On the other hand, the proportions of people with Islamic faith with 3.2%, and of Orthodox faith, with 2.5%,
are both below the average (Vienna citywide: 7.8% or 6%). The proportion of the Evangelical people
was 6.7% of the district population, the second highest in Vienna.
Nearly 27.3% of the district population, in 2001, belonged to no religion, where this was the 3rd highest
value of a Vienna district. Another 5.1% of the population had expressed either none or some other religion.

Notable people

 Richard Beer-Hofmann, lived in Rodaun
 Franziska Donner, born in Inzersdorf
 Rudolf Edinger, born in Erlaa
 Christian von Ehrenfels, born in Rodaun
 Werner Faymann, lived in Liesing
 Hugo von Hofmannsthal, lived in Rodaun
 Hanns Hörbiger, born in Atzgersdorf and lived in Mauer
 Gisbert Kapp, born in Mauer
 Franz Konrad (1906–1952), SS officer executed for war crimes
 Heinrich Krause, born in Rodaun
 Ludwig von Bertalanffy, born in Atzgersdorf
 Kurt Peters, chemist born in Atzgersdorf
 Adelheid Popp, born in Inzersdorf
 Anton Romako, born in Atzgersdorf
 Karl Skraup
 Leopold Vogl, born in Atzgersdorf
 John Banner
 La Jana, born in Mauer
 Hermann Beyfuss, for whom Beyfusgasse was named in 1954

Notes

References
 "Wien - 13. Bezirk/Liesing", Wien.gv.at, 2008, webpage (15 subpages): Wien.gv.at-liesing (in German).
 Primo Calvi: Darstellung des politischen Bezirkes Hietzing Umgebung durch umfassende Beschreibung aller Dörfer, Ortschaften, Kirchen, Schulen, Schlösser, Anstalten und bemerkenswerten Objecte etc. etc. ("Political representation of the District Hietzing environment through comprehensive description of all villages, towns, churches, schools, palaces, prisons and remarkable objects, etc."). Selbstverlag, Vienna 1901.
 Josef Jahne: Heimatkunde des politischen Bezirkes Hietzing-Umgebung für Schule und Haus. Selbstverlag, Vienna 1911.
 Ferdinand Opll: Liesing: Geschichte des 23. Wiener Gemeindebezirks und seiner alten Orte ("History of the 23rd Viennese District and its Places"). Jugend und Volk, Vienna 1982, .
 Josef Roskosny: Liesing: Ein junger Bezirk mit Vergangenheit ("Liesing: A Young District with Age"). Mohl, Vienna 1979, .
 Rudolf Spitzer: Liesing: Altes erhalten – Neues gestalten. Mohl, Vienna 1994, .
 Birgit Trinker (Redaktion): Wiener Bezirkshandbücher. 23. Bezirk ("Vienna District Handbook: 23rd District"). Pichler, Vienna 2002, .

External links 
 
 Official web site 

 
Districts of Vienna